The Stratford Center Historic District is a  historic district in Stratford, Connecticut.  The district was listed on the National Register of Historic Places in 1983.  It then included 257 contributing buildings.

It is significant for historical association, for architecture, and for information potential (the latter for possible archeological investigation of the Academy Hill Green area of a 17th-century fort.

Selected significant elements in the district include:
Capt. David Judson House, 967 Academy Hill, built 1723, which in 1978 was a museum run by the Stratford Historical Society 
William A. Booth House, 956 Broad Street, built 1857, designed by architect Leopold Eidlitz in "Swiss Chalet" style
Lieut. William Thompson House, 904 East Broadway, a saltbox from 1762
Old Episcopal burying ground
First Congregational Church, 2301 Main Street (accompanying photograph #7)
The district also includes dozens of other historical houses including the Stratford Shakespeare American Theatre, a singular 1500 seat venue where currently popular American Hollywood actors have performed.

See also
National Register of Historic Places listings in Fairfield County, Connecticut

References

National Register of Historic Places in Fairfield County, Connecticut
Stratford, Connecticut
Historic districts in Fairfield County, Connecticut
Historic districts on the National Register of Historic Places in Connecticut